Sumiya Bilguun (born January 1, 1997, Mongolia) is the fifth Chess Grandmaster from Mongolia.He earned FIDE Master in 2011 and International Master in 2016.He became Chess Grandmaster in 2020.

Notable Tournaments

References 
Chess grandmasters
1977 births
Living people
Mongolian chess players